

England

Head Coach: Andy Robinson

 Iain Balshaw
 Olly Barkley
 Duncan Bell
 Steve Borthwick
 Ben Cohen
 Martin Corry (c.)*
 Mark Cueto
 Matt Dawson
 Harry Ellis
 James Forrester
 Andy Goode
 Danny Grewcock
 Andy Hazell
 Charlie Hodgson
 Chris Jones
 Ben Kay
 Josh Lewsey
 Lewis Moody
 Jamie Noon
 Henry Paul
 Jason Robinson (c.) 
 Graham Rowntree
 Andrew Sheridan
 Ollie Smith
 Matt Stevens
 Mathew Tait
 Steve Thompson
 Andy Titterrell
 Phil Vickery
 Julian White
 Joe Worsley
 Mike Worsley

*captain in the last two games

France

Head Coach: Bernard Laporte

 Benoit Baby
 Serge Betsen
 Julien Bonnaire
 Sébastien Bruno
 Sébastien Chabal
 Pieter de Villiers
 Yann Delaigue
 Christophe Dominici
 Pepito Elhorga
 Jean-Philippe Grandclaude
 Imanol Harinordoquy
 Cédric Heymans
 Yannick Jauzion
 Julien Laharrague
 Gregory Lamboley
 Brian Liebenberg
 Sylvain Marconnet
 Jimmy Marlu
 David Marty
 Nicolas Mas
 Frédéric Michalak
 Pierre Mignoni
 Olivier Milloud
 Yannick Nyanga
 Pascal Papé
 Fabien Pelous (c)
 Aurélien Rougerie
 William Servat
 Dimitri Szarzewski
 Patrick Tabacco
 Jérôme Thion
 Damien Traille
 Ludovic Valbon
 Dimitri Yachvili

Ireland

Head Coach: Eddie O'Sullivan

 Simon Best
 Tommy Bowe
 Shane Byrne
 Kieran Campbell
 Reggie Corrigan
 Leo Cullen
 Gordon D'Arcy
 Girvan Dempsey
 Gavin Duffy
 Guy Easterby
 Simon Easterby
 Anthony Foley
 John Hayes
 Denis Hickie
 Marcus Horan
 Anthony Horgan
 Shane Horgan
 David Humphreys
 Bernard Jackman
 Denis Leamy
 Kevin Maggs
 Ronan McCormack
 Eric Miller
 Geordan Murphy
 Donncha O'Callaghan
 Paul O'Connell (c.)*
 Jonny O'Connor
 Brian O'Driscoll (c.)
 Ronan O'Gara
 Malcolm O'Kelly
 Shaun Payne
 Alan Quinlan
 Frankie Sheahan
 Peter Stringer
 Roger Wilson

*captain in the second game

Italy

Head Coach: John Kirwan

 Matteo Barbini
 Mauro Bergamasco
 Mirco Bergamasco
 Marco Bortolami (c.)
 Gonzalo Canale
 Martin Castrogiovanni
 David Dal Maso
 Roland de Marigny
 Carlo Del Fava
 Santiago Dellapè
 Carlo Festuccia
 Paul Griffen
 Giorgio Intoppa
 Andrea Lo Cicero
 Andrea Masi
 Ludovico Nitoglia
 Fabio Ongaro
 Silvio Orlando
 Luciano Orquera
 Sergio Parisse
 Roberto Pedrazzi
 Gert Peens
 Aaron Persico
 Salvatore Perugini
 Simon Picone
 Walter Pozzebon
 Kaine Robertson
 Mario Savi
 Cristian Stoica
 Alessandro Troncon

Scotland

Head Coach: Matt Williams

 Graeme Beveridge
 Mike Blair
 Gordon Bulloch (c.)
 Andy Craig
 Chris Cusiter
 Simon Danielli
 Bruce Douglas
 Jon Dunbar
 Stuart Grimes
 Andrew Henderson
 Nathan Hines
 Ben Hinshelwood
 Allister Hogg
 Gavin Kerr
 Rory Lamont
 Sean Lamont
 Scott Murray
 Dan Parks
 Chris Paterson
 Jon Petrie
 Gordon Ross
 Robbie Russell
 Tom Smith
 Hugo Southwell
 Simon Taylor
 Simon Webster
 Jason White

Wales

Head Coach: Mike Ruddock

 Brent Cockbain
 Gareth Cooper
 Mefin Davies
 Ian Gough
 Gavin Henson
 Gethin Jenkins
 Adam Jones
 Dafydd Jones
 Ryan Jones
 Stephen Jones
 Hal Luscombe
 Robin McBryde
 Kevin Morgan
 Michael Owen
 Sonny Parker
 Dwayne Peel
 Mike Phillips
 Tom Shanklin
 Robert Sidoli
 Robin Sowden-Taylor
 Ceri Sweeney
 Mark Taylor
 Gareth Thomas (c.)
 Jonathan Thomas
 Martyn Williams
 Rhys Williams
 Shane Williams
 John Yapp

External links
 RBS Six Nations Squad Index

2005
2005 Six Nations Championship